Kill Division is the third album by Dutch thrash metal band Dead Head, released in 1999. The album was produced by Bert Westerhuis at Westerhuis Audio.

Track listing

Personnel
Tom van Dijk – bass, vocals
Robbie Woning – guitar
Ronnie van der Wey – guitar
Hans Spijker – drums

References

Dead Head albums
1999 albums